Aygul Ildusovna Idrisova (born July 11, 1995, Ishimbay, Russia) is an international draughts player. She was third in 2017 World Draughts Championshiphas and won the 2016 European championships, and World and European championships Juniors Girls in 2013 and 2014. International grandmaster (GMIF).

Aygul Idrisova began play draughts at 6 years old. In 2004 she was a participant in the national women's draughts championship.

Sport achievements

World Championship
 2013 (19 place in final B)
 2015 (6 place)
 2017 (3 place)
 2019 (2 place)
 2021 (9 place)

European Championship
 2012 (4 place)
 2014 (6 place)
 2016 (1 place)
 2018 (16 place)

Russian championship
 2010 (10 place)
 2011 (3 place)
 2012 (2 place)
 2013 (5 place)
 2014 (8 place)
 2015 (2 place)
 2016 (2 place)
 2018 (3 place)
 2020 (14 place)
 2021 (2 place)

External links
 Profile FMJD
 Profile KNDB

References

1995 births
Russian draughts players
Players of international draughts
Bashkir people
Living people
Bashkir women
People from Ishimbay